In 20 February 2022, in the Nepalese capital, Kathmandu, people protested against the US-backed infrastructure program. Police used tear gas and water cannons to disperse the protesters. A protester said that the agreement will undermine Nepal's law and integrity. A statement from the US embassy said the project was requested by the Nepalese government and people and was designed to reduce poverty and boost Nepal's economy in a transparent manner.

References

2022 in Nepal
2022 protests
February 2022 events in Asia
Protests in Nepal
Nepal–United States relations